A one-hit wonder or viral hit is any entity that achieves mainstream popularity, often for only one piece of work, and becomes known among the general public solely for that momentary success.  The term is most commonly used in regard to music performers with only one hit single that overshadows their other work. Some artists dubbed "one-hit wonders" in a particular country have had great success in other countries. Music artists with subsequent popular albums and hit listings are typically not considered a one-hit wonder. One-hit wonders usually see their popularity decreasing after their hit listing and most often do not ever return to hit listings with other songs or albums.

Music industry

In The Billboard Book of One-Hit Wonders, music journalist Wayne Jancik defines a one-hit wonder as "an act that has won a position on [the] national, pop, Top 40 record chart just once."

This formal definition can include acts with greater success outside their lone pop hit and who are not typically considered one-hit wonders, while at the same time excluding acts who have multiple hits which have been overshadowed by one signature song, or those performers who never hit the top 40, but had exactly one song achieve mainstream popularity in some other fashion (that is, a "turntable hit" or a song that was ineligible for the top-40 charts). One-hit wonders are usually exclusive to a specific market, either a country or a genre; a performer may be a one-hit wonder in one such arena, but have multiple hits (or no hits) in another.

Lists of one-hit wonders

Australia

"20 to 1: One Hit Wonders"

In 2006, the Australian series 20 to 1 aired the episode "20 to 1: One Hit Wonders", a list of songs that had been the only one by that artist to have success in Australia.

Ireland

New Zealand

C4's UChoose40: One Hit Wonders
In September 2006, New Zealand's terrestrial music channel, C4, aired an episode dedicated to "One Hit Wonders" on the weekly theme-based chart show, UChoose40, where the chart was ranked entirely by viewer's votes from the website.

The top ten songs were ranked as follows:

United Kingdom

Note: not to be confused with the Guinness Book of British Hit Singles list from 1979 to 2001 which lists acts with their only Top 75 charting record being a one number hit. Several of these artists including The Proclaimers, Shakespears Sister, Haddaway, Kajagoogoo and Hanson have in fact had more than two Top Ten hits.

The Nation's Favourite One Hit Wonders (2016)
A UK poll of 2,000 music fans compiled by marketing research company OnePoll.

One-Hit Wonders from the 1980s
Classic Pop magazine's list only includes acts who made the UK’s Top 40 (as compiled by Gallup) once only in their careers and does not include acts which feature members from other successful bands from the 1980s. The top ten is as follows:

One-Hit Wonders from the 1990s
In 2020, Absolute Radio 90s compiled a list of 'the 20 greatest one-hit wonders of the 1990s' as part of their 10th birthday celebrations; the list was as follows (listed in alphabetical order): 
 "Spaceman" – Babylon Zoo (1996)
 "Wake Up Boo!" – The Boo Radleys (1995)
 "Drinking in L.A." – Bran Van 3000 (1997)
 "Bitch" – Meredith Brooks (1997)
 "Would I Lie To You?" – Charles & Eddie (1992)
 "Brimful of Asha" (Norman Cook Remix) – Cornershop (1997)
 "Mmm Mmm Mmm Mmm" – Crash Test Dummies (1993)
 "What's Up?" – 4 Non Blondes (1993)
 "There She Goes" – The La's (1990)
 "Steal My Sunshine" – Len (1999)
 "Everybody's Free (To Wear Sunscreen)" – Baz Luhrmann (1999)
 "The Impression That I Get" – The Mighty Mighty Bosstones (1997)
 "Flat Beat" – Mr. Oizo (1999)
 "You Get What You Give" – New Radicals (1998)
 "You’re Not Alone" – Olive (1997)
 "How Bizarre" – OMC (1995)
 "In The Meantime" – Spacehog (1996)
 "Two Princes" – Spin Doctors (1993)
 "Inside" – Stiltskin (1994)
 "Your Woman" – White Town (1997)

In addition to these one-hit wonders, the NME also recognised the following hits in their one-hit wonders feature from 2014: 
 "Sleeping Satellite" – Tasmin Archer (1992)
 "No Rain" – Blind Melon (1993)
 "Tubthumping" – Chumbawamba (1997)
 "Save Tonight" – Eagle-Eye Cherry (1997)
 "Groove Is in the Heart" – Deee-Lite (1990)
 "Breakfast at Tiffany’s" – Deep Blue Something (1995)
 "I Touch Myself" – Divinyls (1990)
 "To Earth with Love" – Gay Dad (1999)
 "Three Little Pigs" – Green Jellÿ (1992)
 "Glorious" – Andreas Johnson (1999)
 "Here Comes the Hotstepper" – Ini Kamoze (1994)
 "Jump" – Kris Kross (1992)
 "Stay" – Lisa Loeb (1994)
 "Can You Dig It?" – The Mock Turtles (1991)
 "One Of Us" – Joan Osborne (1995)
 "I’ll Be There For You" – The Rembrandts (1995)
 "Everybody's Free (To Feel Good)" – Rozalla (1991)
 "Scatman (Ski-Ba-Bop-Ba-Dop-Bop)" – Scatman John (1994)
 "Closing Time" – Semisonic (1998)
 "Baby Got Back" – Sir Mix-a-Lot (1992)
 "Runaway Train" – Soul Asylum (1993)
 "Connected" – Stereo MC's (1992)
 "Cotton Eye Joe" – Rednex (1994)
 "One Headlight" – The Wallflowers (1997)
 "Hobo Humpin' Slobo Babe" – Whale

One-Hit Wonders from the 2000s
From the BBC in March 2017 (based on a combination of chart position and sales):
 Afroman – "Because I Got High" (2001)
 The Bravery – "An Honest Mistake" (2005)
 DJ Pied Piper & The Masters of Ceremonies – "Do You Really Like It?" (2001)
 Duffy – "Mercy" (2008)
 Gnarls Barkley – "Crazy" (2006)
 Junior Senior – "Move Your Feet" (2002)
 Las Ketchup – "The Ketchup Song (Aserejé)" (2002)
 Spiller (featuring Sophie Ellis-Bextor) – "Groovejet (If This Ain't Love)" (2000)

From the BBC Radio 2 show One Hit Wonders with OJ Borg which started on 2 November 2020...(in alphabetical order):
 Bodyrockers – "I Like the Way"
 Caesars – "Jerk It Out" 
 Kevin Lyttle (feat. Spraga Benz) – "Turn Me On"
 Nizlopi – "The JCB Song"
 Planet Funk – "Chase the Sun"
 Sweet Female Attitude – "Flowers" 
 The Temper Trap – "Sweet Disposition"

One-Hit Wonders from the 2010s
The Official Charts Company's list of the biggest one-hit wonder releases of the 2010s, is based on sales and streams. Like the Classic Pop list it uses the UK singles Top 40 chart as the cut-off point. The top ten is as follows:

United States

See also
15 minutes of fame
 Homo unius libri – Latin phrase meaning "man of one book".
Signature song
Summer hit
 "One-Hit Wonder" by Blair Packham, a 2004 song about the classic one-hit wonder "Monster Mash" by Bobby Pickett.
That Thing You Do! – a 1996 American comedy film about the rise and fall of a fictional 1960s one-hit wonder pop band.
List of one-hit wonders on the UK Albums Chart – artists who have had a number one hit album and charted one Top 40 hit album in the OCC chart
List of one-hit wonders on the UK Singles Downloads Chart – including separate lists for featured artists and ensemble groups
List of one-hit wonders on the UK Singles Chart – artists who have had a number one hit single and charted one Top 75 hit single in the OCC chart

References

Further reading 
Mordden, Ethan (1980) A Guide to Orchestral Music. New York: Oxford University Press. 
Jancik, Wayne (1998). The Billboard Book of One-Hit Wonders. New York: Billboard Books. 
One Hit Wonders, 2003, Dg Deutsche Grammophon, catalog number 472700. The composers DG includes in this compilation are: Richard Addinsell, Tomaso Albinoni, Hugo Alfvén, Samuel Barber, Luigi Boccherini, Joseph Canteloube, Marc-Antoine Charpentier, Jeremiah Clarke, Léo Delibes, Paul Dukas, Reinhold Glière, Ferde Grofé, Mikhail Ippolitov-Ivanov, Dmitri Kabalevsky, Aram Khachaturian, Edward MacDowell, Pietro Mascagni, Jules Massenet, Jean-Joseph Mouret, Carl Orff, Johann Pachelbel, Amilcare Ponchielli, Heitor Villa-Lobos, Emil Waldteufel, Peter Warlock, and Charles-Marie Widor.

External links
 Top 15 One Hit Wonders
Top 10 Classical One Hit Wonders
 11 Music Superstars Who are Technically One-Hit Wonders

20th century in music
Music fandom
Record charts
Musical terminology